Beatrice Mary MacDonald ARRC (September 27, 1881 – September 4, 1969), an American Army nurse during World War I, received a Purple Heart for combat wounds on January 4, 1936, making her retroactively the first women to receive the award. MacDonald was also one of three women to receive the United States Distinguished Service Cross for her heroism during World War I. Other awards for her heroism include the French Croix de Guerre (Bronze), the British Military Medal for gallantry, the British Royal Red Cross (Second Class) medal, and the United States Distinguished Service Medal.

Early life, education, and early career  
MacDonald was born in North Bedeque community of Prince Edward Island, Canada. MacDonald relocated to New York City to further her education, and graduated from New York City Hospital Nursing School.

World War I 
MacDonald was living in New York City during the outbreak of World War I. In 1915, MacDonald volunteered for the American Ambulance Service and went to the American Hospital of Paris for a short stint. After returning to the United States she went to work for the New York surgeon George Emerson Brewer as an office manager.

MacDonald enlisted in United States Army Nursing Corp in 1917 with a unit from Presbyterian Hospital. MacDonald served in France at the British Casualty Clearing Station No. 61. On August 17, 1917, MacDonald was injured during a German air raid on the front line during the Third Battle of Ypres.

Recognition and awards 
MacDonald received the Distinguished Service Cross on February 27, 1919 from the United States Congress making her the first woman to receive the award and one of only six women during World War I. Other awards at the time for her heroism include the French Croix de Guerre (Bronze), the British Military Medal for gallantry, the British Royal Red Cross (Second Class) medal, and the United States Distinguished Service Medal.

Purple Heart 
After General Douglas MacArthur created the Purple Heart for combat wounds, MacDonald applied for and received the first Purple Heart awarded to a woman on January 4, 1936. By both her date of injury and her award date, she is the first woman to be awarded a Purple Heart.

References 

1881 births
1969 deaths
People from Prince County, Prince Edward Island
World War I nurses
Canadian emigrants to the United States
American nurses
American women nurses
Associate Members of the Royal Red Cross
Recipients of the Military Medal